Shalkar, formerly known as "Pobeda" (Победа), is a village in the Karaganda Region, Kazakhstan. It is part of the Bukhar-Zhyrau rural district (KATO code - 354043300). Population:

Geography
Shalkar is located by the shore of the northern tip of lake Rudnichnoye. Semizbughy village is located to the southwest of the village, beyond the lake.

References

External links
"Тайна четырёх озёр" - Autotourist.kz (in Russian)

Populated places in Karaganda Region

ru:Шалкар (Карагандинская область)